Charmaine Soh Shi Hui (born 24 March 1990) is a Singaporean netball player and captain of the Singapore national team who plays either as a goal attack or goal shooter. Charmaine officially captained the national side at the 2019 Netball World Cup replacing Vanessa Marie Lee who took a brief break from the sport in 2018. She has featured in three World Cup tournaments for Singapore in 2011, 2015 and 2019.

Career 
Charmaine Soh has been a regular member of the Singaporean team since 2011 following her debut Netball World Cup appearance during the 2011 edition. She was a member of the Singaporean team which emerged as champions during the 2012 Asian Netball Championships defeating home side Sri Lanka 48–47 in a close thriller. She was one of the key members of the Singaporean contingent which claimed gold medal in the women's netball event during 2015 Southeast Asian Games and was part of the Singaporean squad which bagged silver at the 2017 Southeast Asian Games.

Soh made her captaincy debut in 2019 as she captained the national side at the 2019 Netball World Cup tournament where the team finished at last position among the 16 teams.

Soh is widely known for her calm composure and her ability to shoot from anywhere around the shooting circle, making her shooting accuracy comparable to the likes of the world's best shooters such as Maria Folau according to multiple commentators commenting on matches between Singapore and their opponents during the 2015 Netball World Cup and the 2019 Netball World Cup

In October 2019, she was included in the Singaporean squad for the 2019 M1 Nations Cup and was retained as the captain of the team for the tournament. She was part of the national team which emerged as runners-up to Namibia in the final.

References 

1990 births
Living people
Singaporean netball players
Southeast Asian Games gold medalists for Singapore
Southeast Asian Games silver medalists for Singapore
Southeast Asian Games medalists in netball
Competitors at the 2015 Southeast Asian Games
Competitors at the 2017 Southeast Asian Games
Competitors at the 2019 Southeast Asian Games
2019 Netball World Cup players
2011 World Netball Championships players
2015 Netball World Cup players
Singaporean sportspeople of Chinese descent
21st-century Singaporean women